Baodi railway station is a railway station in Baodi District, Tianjin, China. The station opened on 30 December 2022. The station has two island platforms and two side platforms for a total of six platform faces.

The station is on the Beijing–Tangshan intercity railway and the Beijing–Binhai intercity railway which share a set of tracks to the west.

Name
The station name Baodi was originally used for another station, but this was renamed Baodi North railway station on 30 August 2022.

References 

Railway stations in Tianjin